This is a list of the main career statistics of Swiss former professional tennis player Roger Federer. All statistics are according to the ATP Tour website. Federer won 103 ATP singles titles including 20 major singles titles, 28 ATP Masters titles, and a shared record of six ATP Finals. Federer was also a gold medalist in men's doubles with Stan Wawrinka at the 2008 Beijing Olympics and a silver medalist in men's singles at the 2012 London Olympics.

Representing Switzerland, Federer assisted in winning the 2014 Davis Cup and a record three Hopman Cup titles (2001, 2018 and 2019). He is the first Swiss male player to win a major title, the only Swiss male player to hold the No. 1 ranking in singles, and the only Swiss player, male or female to win all four majors. At the international level, he helped Team Europe win three consecutive Laver Cup titles, the 2017, 2018 and 2019 editions.

Historic achievements

Federer has won 20 Grand Slam men's singles titles, third behind Djokovic (22) and Nadal (22). He was the first male player to win more than 14 Grand Slams. He has reached 31 Grand Slam singles finals, second-most behind Djokovic (10 consecutive, and another 8 consecutive—the two longest streaks in men's tennis history), 23 consecutive semifinal appearances, and 36 consecutive quarterfinal appearances. He is one of eight men to have won a career Grand Slam (winning all four majors at least once) and the second of four players to have won a career Grand Slam on three different surfaces, hard, grass, and clay courts, after Andre Agassi and before Nadal and Djokovic.

Federer is the only male player to win five consecutive US Open titles (2004–08) in the Open Era and in the process win 40 consecutive matches at the US Open. Federer achieved a record streak of 10 consecutive major finals (2005 Wimbledon to 2007 US Open) and never lost 2 consecutive finals during this streak.

Federer is the second male player to reach French Open and Wimbledon finals in the same year for four consecutive years (2006–2009), after Björn Borg (1978–81). Federer is the only male player to appear in seven consecutive Wimbledon finals (2003–2009), second behind Ivan Lendl's record of eight consecutive US Open finals (1982–1989). Federer is second male player to win 40 consecutive Wimbledon matches after Borg and in the process became the only male player to win 40 consecutive matches at two Grand Slams (Wimbledon and the US Open). Federer has won 11 hard court major titles (6 at the Australian Open and 5 at the US Open), second behind only Novak Djokovic (13).

Federer appeared in the French Open, Wimbledon and US Open finals in the same year for four consecutive years (2006–2009), surpassing the old record of Borg who achieve the same task three times in his (Borg) career (1978, 1980–81). Federer is the only male player to appear in Wimbledon and US Open finals in the same year for 6 consecutive years (2004–2008) and won both of them in the same year for 4 consecutive years (2004–2007). Federer has 11 runner-up showings in Grand Slam tournament finals, a record tied with Lendl and later Djokovic.

Federer is the only male player to appear in at least one Grand Slam semifinal for 18 consecutive years (2003–2020). Federer was 12–2 in his first 12 Grand Slam finals (2003 Wimbledon to 2007 US Open), with losses in the 2006 and 2007 French Open finals. Federer's 2005 win–loss record of 81–4 is second to John McEnroe's 1984 win–loss record of 82–3. Federer is the only male player of Open Era to be the winner and runner-up at all four Grand Slams and the second one to do so after Rod Laver in the history of tennis.

Federer has won eight Wimbledon titles, an all-time men's record, surpassing the seven Wimbledon titles won by William Renshaw and Pete Sampras, and later achieved by Djokovic. He is the only male player in history to reach 12 Wimbledon singles finals, and one of only two players to have done this at any Grand Slam event, a record second to Nadal who reached 14 French Open finals. He is the only player to win three different Grand Slam tournaments at least five times (six Australian Open, eight Wimbledon, and five US Open titles) and is the only player to win two different Grand Slam events five consecutive times, at Wimbledon from 2003 to 2007 and the US Open from 2004 to 2008. Federer is one of two players (along with Djokovic) to win two different Grand Slam titles six or more times (six Australian Open and eight Wimbledon).

Federer is the only male player to be seeded No. 1 for 18 consecutive Grand Slam tournaments from 2004 French Open to 2008 Wimbledon.

Federer is one of two male players (along with Djokovic) to win three majors in a calendar year on three different occasions (2004, 2006, 2007). He is the only player to successfully defend three majors (2007 Australian Open, Wimbledon and US Open) that he won the year before. His six Australian Open titles are second behind Djokovic's 10 titles. His 5 US Open titles are record shared with Connors and Sampras.

Federer has spent 310 weeks as the ATP number-one ranked player in the world (including a record 237 consecutive weeks), the second-most of any men's tennis player (since 1973) behind Djokovic. He is the only player in the Open Era, male or female, to be No. 1 for more than four years consecutively (2 February 2004 to 17 August 2008).

He has also recorded more than 11,000 career aces and is third on the all-time list. Federer is the first male player to be ranked number-one for more than 300 weeks, and the only player, male or female, to do so for more than 200 consecutive weeks. Federer is the 2nd male player to win more than 100 ATP Titles (103) second behind Jimmy Connors (109).

Federer is the only player to register at least ten titles on three different surfaces: he has 71 hard-court titles, 19 grass-court titles, and 11 clay-court titles. In his prime years, he won an unparalleled 11 Grand Slam tournaments (3 Australian Open titles, 4 Wimbledon titles, and 4 US Open titles) of a possible 16 events from 2004 to 2007. He reached the finals of all four Grand Slam events in the same calendar year three times in his career in 2006, 2007, and 2009, joining Laver (1969) and later joined by Djokovic (2015, 2021). In the ATP Tour Finals, Federer has won six titles (a record shared with Djokovic) in 10 finals (a stand-alone record) at the year-end tournament featuring the top eight players in the year-end rankings. He has qualified for the tournament a record 17 times, including a record 14 consecutive years from 2002 through 2015.

Federer's 2006 season is considered by most tennis experts to be one of the most dominant years of the Open Era. He won three Grand Slam singles titles, reached the final of the fourth, and won the season-ending Masters Cup. He won four Masters Series events, winning 12 events of the 17 he entered and making the finals of all but one. His overall record was 92 wins and 5 losses.

Federer became the oldest number-one player on the ATP rankings list (aged 36) in February 2018.

Because of these many accomplishments, Federer is considered by many sports analysts to be the greatest tennis player of all time.

Performance timelines

Only main-draw results in ATP Tour, Grand Slam tournaments, Davis Cup, Laver Cup and Olympic Games are included in win–loss records.

Singles
{|class="wikitable nowrap" style=text-align:center;font-size:83%
|-
!Tournament
!1998
!1999
!2000
!2001
!2002
!2003
!2004
!2005
!2006
!2007
!2008
!2009
!2010
!2011
!2012
!2013
!2014
!2015
!2016
!2017
!2018
!2019
!2020
!2021
! SR 
! W–L 
!Win %
|-
|colspan="28" style="text-align:left;"|Grand Slam tournaments
|-
|style="background:#efefef;" align=left|Australian Open
|A
|Q1
|style="background:#afeeee;"|3R
|style="background:#afeeee;"|3R
|style="background:#afeeee;"|4R
|style="background:#afeeee;"|4R
|style="background:lime;"|W
|style="background:yellow;"|SF
|style="background:lime;"|W
|style="background:lime;"|W
|style="background:yellow;"|SF
|style="background:thistle;"|F
|style="background:lime;"|W
|style="background:yellow;"|SF
|style="background:yellow;"|SF
|style="background:yellow;"|SF
|style="background:yellow;"|SF
|style="background:#afeeee;"|3R
|style="background:yellow;"|SF
|style="background:lime;"|W
|style="background:lime;"|W
|style="background:#afeeee;"|4R
|style="background:yellow;"|SF
|A
|style="background:#efefef;"|6 / 21
|style="background:#efefef;"|102–15
|style="background:#efefef;"|
|-
|style="background:#efefef;" align=left|French Open
|A
|style="background:#afeeee;"|1R
|style="background:#afeeee;"|4R
|style="background:blanchedalmond;"|QF
|style="background:#afeeee;"|1R
|style="background:#afeeee;"|1R
|style="background:#afeeee;"|3R
|style="background:yellow;"|SF
|style="background:thistle;"|F
|style="background:thistle;"|F
|style="background:thistle;"|F
|style="background:lime;"|W
|style="background:blanchedalmond;"|QF
|style="background:thistle;"|F
|style="background:yellow;"|SF
|style="background:blanchedalmond;"|QF
|style="background:#afeeee;"|4R
|style="background:blanchedalmond;"|QF
|A
|A
|A
|style="background:yellow;"|SF
|A
|style="background:#afeeee;"|4R
|style="background:#efefef;"|1 / 19
|style="background:#efefef;"|73–17
|style="background:#efefef;"|
|-
|style="background:#efefef;" align=left|Wimbledon
|A
|style="background:#afeeee;"|1R
|style="background:#afeeee;"|1R
|style="background:blanchedalmond;"|QF
|style="background:#afeeee;"|1R
|style="background:lime;"|W
|style="background:lime;"|W
|style="background:lime;"|W
|style="background:lime;"|W
|style="background:lime;"|W
|style="background:thistle;"|F
|style="background:lime;"|W
|style="background:blanchedalmond;"|QF
|style="background:blanchedalmond;"|QF
|style="background:lime;"|W
|style="background:#afeeee;"|2R
|style="background:thistle;"|F
|style="background:thistle;"|F
|style="background:yellow;"|SF
|style="background:lime;"|W
|style="background:blanchedalmond;"|QF
|style="background:thistle;"|F
|style=color:#767676|NH*
|style="background:blanchedalmond;"|QF
|style="background:#efefef;"|8 / 22
|style="background:#efefef;"|105–14
|style="background:#efefef;"|
|-
|style="background:#efefef;" align=left|US Open
|A
|Q2
|style="background:#afeeee;"|3R
|style="background:#afeeee;"|4R
|style="background:#afeeee;"|4R
|style="background:#afeeee;"|4R
|style="background:lime;"|W
|style="background:lime;"|W
|style="background:lime;"|W
|style="background:lime;"|W
|style="background:lime;"|W
|style="background:thistle;"|F
|style="background:yellow;"|SF
|style="background:yellow;"|SF
|style="background:blanchedalmond;"|QF
|style="background:#afeeee;"|4R
|style="background:yellow;"|SF
|style="background:thistle;"|F
|A
|style="background:blanchedalmond;"|QF
|style="background:#afeeee;"|4R
|style="background:blanchedalmond;"|QF
|A
|A
|style="background:#efefef;"|5 / 19
|style="background:#efefef;"|89–14
|style="background:#efefef;"|
|-style="font-weight:bold;background:#efefef;"
|style=text-align:left|Win–loss
|0–0
|0–2
|7–4
|13–4
|6–4
|13–3
|22–1
|24–2
|27–1
|26–1
|24–3
|26–2
|20–3
|20–4
|19–3
|13–4
|19–4
|18–4
|10–2
|18–1
|14–2
|18–4
|5–1
|7–1
|style="background:#efefef;"|20 / 81
|style="background:#efefef;"|369–60
|style="background:#efefef;"|
|-
|colspan="28" style="text-align:left;"|Year-end championships
|-
|style="background:#efefef;" align=left|ATP Finals
|colspan=4|DNQ
|style="background:yellow;"|SF
|style="background:lime;"|W
|style="background:lime;"|W
|style="background:thistle;"|F
|style="background:lime;"|W
|style="background:lime;"|W
|style="background:#afeeee;"|RR
|style="background:yellow;"|SF
|style="background:lime;"|W
|style="background:lime;"|W
|style="background:thistle;"|F
|style="background:yellow;"|SF
|style="background:thistle;"|F
|style="background:thistle;"|F
|DNQ
|style="background:yellow;"|SF
|style="background:yellow;"|SF
|style="background:yellow;"|SF
|A
|colspan=1|DNQ
|style="background:#efefef;"|6 / 17
|style="background:#efefef;"|59–17
|style="background:#efefef;"|
|-
|colspan="28" style="text-align:left;"|National representation
|-
|style="background:#efefef;" align=left|Olympic Games
|colspan=2 style=color:#767676|NH
|style="background:yellow;"|4th
|colspan=3 style=color:#767676|NH
|style="background:#afeeee;"|2R
|colspan=3 style=color:#767676|NH
|style="background:#ffebcd;"|QF
|colspan=3 style=color:#767676|NH
|style="background:silver;"|S
|colspan=3 style=color:#767676|NH
|A
|colspan=4 style=color:#767676|NH
|A
|style="background:#efefef;"|0 / 4
|style="background:#efefef;"|13–5
|style="background:#efefef;"|
|-
|style="background:#efefef;" align=left|Davis Cup
|A
|style="background:blanchedalmond;"|QF
|style="background:#afeeee;"|1R
|style="background:blanchedalmond;"|QF
|style="background:#afeeee;"|1R
|style="background:yellow;"|SF
|style="background:blanchedalmond;"|QF
|bgcolor=ecf2ff|PO
|bgcolor=ecf2ff|PO
|bgcolor=ecf2ff|PO
|bgcolor=ecf2ff|PO
|bgcolor=ecf2ff|PO
|A
|bgcolor=ecf2ff|PO
|style="background:#afeeee;"|1R
|A
|style="background:lime;"|W
|bgcolor=ecf2ff|PO
|A
|A
|A
|A
|A
|A
|style="background:#efefef;"|1 / 8
|style="background:#efefef;"|40–8
|style="background:#efefef;"|
|-
|colspan="28" style="text-align:left;"|ATP Tour Masters 1000
|-
|style="background:#efefef;" align=left|Indian Wells Masters
|A
|A
|Q1
|style="background:#afeeee;"|1R
|style="background:#afeeee;"|3R
|style="background:#afeeee;"|2R
|style="background:lime;"|W
|style="background:lime;"|W
|style="background:lime;"|W
|style="background:#afeeee;"|2R
|style="background:yellow;"|SF
|style="background:yellow;"|SF
|style="background:#afeeee;"|3R
|style="background:yellow;"|SF
|style="background:lime;"|W
|style="background:#ffebcd;"|QF
|style="background:thistle;"|F
|style="background:thistle;"|F
|A
|style="background:lime;"|W
|style="background:thistle;"|F
|style="background:thistle;"|F
|style="color:#767676" |NH*
|A
|style="background:#efefef;"|5 / 18
|style="background:#efefef;"|66–13
|style="background:#efefef;"|
|-
|style="background:#efefef;" align=left|Miami Open
|A
|style="background:#afeeee;"|1R
|style="background:#afeeee;"|2R
|style="background:blanchedalmond;"|QF
|style="background:thistle;"|F
|style="background:blanchedalmond;"|QF
|style="background:#afeeee;"|3R
|style="background:lime;"|W
|style="background:lime;"|W
|style="background:#afeeee;"|4R
|style="background:blanchedalmond;"|QF
|style="background:yellow;"|SF
|style="background:#afeeee;"|4R
|style="background:yellow;"|SF
|style="background:#afeeee;"|3R
|A
|style="background:blanchedalmond;"|QF
|A
|A
|style="background:lime;"|W
|style="background:#afeeee;"|2R
|style="background:lime;"|W
|style="color:#767676" |NH*
|A
|style="background:#efefef;"|4 / 18
|style="background:#efefef;"|56–14
|style="background:#efefef;"|
|-
|style="background:#efefef;" align=left|Monte-Carlo Masters
|A
|style="background:#afeeee;"|1R
|style="background:#afeeee;"|1R
|style="background:blanchedalmond;"|QF
|style="background:#afeeee;"|2R
|A
|A
|style="background:blanchedalmond;"|QF
|style="background:thistle;"|F
|style="background:thistle;"|F
|style="background:thistle;"|F
|style="background:#afeeee;"|3R
|A
|style="background:blanchedalmond;"|QF
|A
|A
|style="background:thistle;"|F
|style="background:#afeeee;"|3R
|style="background:blanchedalmond;"|QF
|A
|A
|A
|style="color:#767676" |NH*
|A
|style="background:#efefef;"|0 / 13
|style="background:#efefef;"|30–13
|style="background:#efefef;"|
|-
|style="background:#efefef;" align=left|Madrid Open1
|A
|A
|style="background:#afeeee;"|1R
|style="background:#afeeee;"|1R
|style="background:lime;"|W
|style="background:#afeeee;"|3R
|style="background:lime;"|W
|style="background:lime;"|W
|A
|style="background:lime;"|W
|style="background:thistle;"|F
|style="background:lime;"|W
|style="background:thistle;"|F
|style="background:yellow;"|SF
|style="background:lime;"|W
|style="background:#afeeee;"|3R
|A
|style="background:#afeeee;"|2R
|A
|A
|A
|style="background:#ffebcd;"|QF
|style="color:#767676" |NH*
|A
|style="background:#efefef;"|6 / 15
|style="background:#efefef;"|49–9
|style="background:#efefef;"|
|-
|style="background:#efefef;" align=left|Italian Open
|A
|A
|style="background:#afeeee;"|1R
|style="background:#afeeee;"|3R
|style="background:#afeeee;"|1R
|style="background:thistle;"|F
|style="background:#afeeee;"|2R
|A
|style="background:thistle;"|F
|style="background:#afeeee;"|3R
|style="background:blanchedalmond;"|QF
|style="background:yellow;"|SF
|style="background:#afeeee;"|2R
|style="background:#afeeee;"|3R
|style="background:yellow;"|SF
|style="background:thistle;"|F
|style="background:#afeeee;"|2R
|style="background:thistle;"|F
|style="background:#afeeee;"|3R
|A
|A
|style="background:#ffebcd;"|QF
|A
|A
|style="background:#efefef;"|0 / 17
|style="background:#efefef;"|34–16
|style="background:#efefef;"|
|-
|style="background:#efefef;" align=left|Canadian Open
|A
|A
|style="background:#afeeee;"|1R
|A
|style="background:#afeeee;"|1R
|style="background:yellow;"|SF
|style="background:lime;"|W
|A
|style="background:lime;"|W
|style="background:thistle;"|F
|style="background:#afeeee;"|2R
|style="background:blanchedalmond;"|QF
|style="background:thistle;"|F
|style="background:#afeeee;"|3R
|A
|A
|style="background:thistle;"|F
|A
|A
|style="background:thistle;"|F
|A
|A
|style=color:#767676|NH*
|A
|style="background:#efefef;"|2 / 12
|style="background:#efefef;"|35–10
|style="background:#efefef;"|
|-
|style="background:#efefef;" align=left|Cincinnati Masters
|A
|A
|style="background:#afeeee;"|1R
|A
|style="background:#afeeee;"|1R
|style="background:#afeeee;"|2R
|style="background:#afeeee;"|1R
|style="background:lime;"|W
|style="background:#afeeee;"|2R
|style="background:lime;"|W
|style="background:#afeeee;"|3R
|style="background:lime;"|W
|style="background:lime;"|W
|style="background:#ffebcd;"|QF
|style="background:lime;"|W
|style="background:#ffebcd;"|QF
|style="background:lime;"|W
|style="background:lime;"|W
|A
|A
|style="background:thistle;"|F
|style="background:#afeeee;"|3R
|A
|A
|style="background:#efefef;"|7 / 17
|style="background:#efefef;"|47–10
|style="background:#efefef;"|
|-
|style="background:#efefef;" align=left|Shanghai Masters2
|A
|A
|style="background:#afeeee;"|2R
|style="background:#afeeee;"|2R
|style="background:blanchedalmond;"|QF
|style="background:yellow;"|SF
|A
|A
|style="background:lime;"|W
|style="background:thistle;"|F
|style="background:yellow;"|SF
|A
|style="background:thistle;"|F
|A
|style="background:yellow;"|SF
|style="background:#afeeee;"|3R 
|style="background:lime;"|W
|style="background:#afeeee;"|2R
|A
|style="background:lime;"|W
|style="background:yellow;"|SF
|style="background:#ffebcd;"|QF
|colspan=2 style=color:#767676|NH*
|style="background:#efefef;"|3 / 15
|style="background:#efefef;"|41–12
|style="background:#efefef;"|
|-
|style="background:#efefef;" align=left|Paris Masters
|A
|A
|style="background:#afeeee;"|1R
|style="background:#afeeee;"|2R
|style="background:blanchedalmond;"|QF
|style="background:blanchedalmond;"|QF
|A
|A
|A
|style="background:#afeeee;"|3R
|style="background:blanchedalmond;"|QF
|style="background:#afeeee;"|2R
|style="background:yellow;"|SF
|style="background:lime;"|W
|A
|style="background:yellow;"|SF
|style="background:blanchedalmond;"|QF
|style="background:#afeeee;"|3R
|A
|A
|style="background:yellow;"|SF
|A
|A
|A
|style="background:#efefef;"|1 / 13
|style="background:#efefef;"|23–11 
|style="background:#efefef;"|
|-style="font-weight:bold;background:#efefef;"
|style=text-align:left|Win–loss
|0–0
|0–2
|2–8
|8–7
|18–8
|21–8
|20–3
|27–1
|34–3
|26–7
|22–8 
|24–6
|22–7
|22–7
|23–3
|14–6
|28–6
|16–6
|3–2
|20–1
|14–5
|17–4
|0–0
|0–0
|style="background:#efefef;"|28 / 138
|style="background:#efefef;"|381–108 
|style="background:#efefef;"|
|-
|colspan="28" style="text-align:left;"|Career statistics
|-
!!!1998!!1999!!2000!!2001!!2002!!2003!!2004!!2005!!2006!!2007!!2008!!2009!!2010!!2011!!2012!!2013!!2014!!2015!!2016!!2017!!2018!!2019!!2020!!2021!!SR!!W–L!!Win %
|-style="background:#efefef;"
|align=left|Tournaments3
|3
|14
|28
|21
|25
|23
|17
|15
|17
|16
|19
|15
|18
|16
|17
|17
|17
|17
|7
|12
|13
|14
|1
|5
|colspan=3|Career total: 367
|-style="font-weight:bold;background:#efefef;"
|style=text-align:left|Titles
|0
|0
|0
|1
|3
|7
|11
|11
|12
|8
|4
|4
|5
|4
|6
|1
|5
|6
|0
|7
|4
|4
|0
|0
|colspan=3|Career total: 103
|-style="font-weight:bold;background:#efefef;"
|style=text-align:left|Finals
|0
|0
|2
|3
|5
|9
|11
|12
|16
|12
|8
|7
|9
|6
|10
|3
|11
|11
|1
|8
|7
|6
|0
|0
|colspan=3|Career total: 157
|-style="background:#efefef;"
|align=left|Hard W–L
|2–1
|7–6
|24–16
|21–9
|30–11
|46–11
|46–4
|50–1
|59–2
|44–6
|34–10
|36–10
|47–7
|46–7
|41–7
|28–11
|56–7
|39–6
|8–2
|42–4
|38–8
|33–7
|5–1
|1–1
|71 / 220
|783–155
|
|-style="background:#efefef;"
|align=left|Grass W–L
|0–0
|0–2
|2–3
|9–3
|5–3
|12–0
|12–0
|12–0
|12–0
|6–0
|11–1
|7–0
|8–2
|6–1
|15–2
|5–1
|9–1
|11–1
|10–3
|12–1
|12–2
|11–1
|0–0
|5–2
|19 / 48
|192–29
|
|-style="background:#efefef;"
|align=left|Clay W–L
|0–1
|0–5
|3–7
|9–5
|12–4
|15–4
|16–2
|15–2
|16–3
|16–3
|21–4
|18–2
|10–4
|12–4
|15–3
|12–5
|8–4
|13–4
|3–2
|0–0
|0–0
|9–2
|0–0
|3–1
|11 / 80
|226–71
|
|-style="background:#efefef;"
|align=left|Carpet W–L
|0–1
|6–4
|7–4
|10–4
|11–4
|5–2
|0–0
|4–1
|5–0
|2–0
|0–0
|colspan=13 style=color:#767676|discontinued
|2 / 19
|50–20
|
|-style="background:#efefef;"
|align=left|Outdoor W–L
|0–1
|1–10
|15–20
|28–13
|34–15
|55–13
|63–5
|66–3
|75–5
|52–6
|54–12
|55–8
|48–12
|48–12
|60–8
|34–12
|56–10
|51–9
|21–7
|44–4
|34–7
|45–8
|5–1
|9–4
|77 / 281
|953–205
|
|-style="background:#efefef;"
|align=left|Indoor W–L
|2–2
|12–7
|21–10
|21–8
|24–7
|23–4
|11–1
|15–1
|17–0
|16–3
|12–3
|6–4
|17–1
|16–0
|11–4
|11–5
|17–2
|12–2
|0–0
|10–1
|16–3
|8–2
|0–0
|0–0
|26 / 86
|298–70
|
|-style="font-weight:bold;background:#efefef;"
|style=text-align:left|Overall W–L4
|2–3
|13–17
|36–30
|49–21
|58–22
|78–17
|74–6
|81–4
|92–5
|68–9
|66–15
|61–12
|65–13
|64–12
|71–12
|45–17
|73–12
|63–11
|21–7
|54–5
|50–10
|53–10
|5–1
|9–4
|103 / 367
|1251–275
|
|-style="font-weight:bold;background:#efefef;"
|style=text-align:left|Win (%)
|
|
|
|
|
|
|
|
|
|
|
|
|
|
|
|
|
|
|
|
|
|
|
|
|colspan=3|
|-style="background:#efefef;"
|align=left|Year-end ranking
|301
|64
|29
|13
|bgcolor=eee8aa|6
|style="background:thistle;"|2
|style="background:lime;"|1
|style="background:lime;"|1
|style="background:lime;"|1
|style="background:lime;"|1
|style="background:thistle;"|2
|style="background:lime;"|1
|style="background:thistle;"|2
|style="background:#9cf;"|3
|style="background:thistle;"|2
|bgcolor=eee8aa|6
|style="background:thistle;"|2
|style="background:#9cf;"|3
|16
|style="background:thistle;"|2
|style="background:#9cf;"|3
|style="background:#9cf;"|3
|bgcolor=eee8aa|5
|16
|colspan=3|{{Tooltip|$ 130,594,339|Career Prize Money – Singles & Doubles combined}}
|}
Note:
Federer received fourth-round walkovers at the US Open (2004 and 2012) and the Wimbledon Championships (2007), and a second-round walkover at the Australian Open (2012), these are not counted as wins, also Federer withdrew before the fourth round of the 2021 French Open.

1 Held as Hamburg Masters (outdoor clay) until 2008, Madrid Masters (outdoor clay) 2009 – present.
2 Held as Stuttgart Masters (indoor hard) until 2001, Madrid Masters (indoor hard) from 2002 to 2008, and Shanghai Masters (outdoor hard) 2009 – present.
3 Including appearances in Grand Slam, ATP Tour main draw matches, and Summer Olympics.
4 Including matches in Grand Slam, ATP Tour events, Summer Olympics, Davis Cup and Laver Cup.
* not held due to COVID-19 pandemic.

Doubles

1 Held as Hamburg Masters (outdoor clay) until 2008, Madrid Masters (outdoor clay) 2009 – present.
2 Held as Stuttgart Masters (indoor hard) until 2001, Madrid Masters (indoor hard) from 2002 to 2008, and Shanghai Masters (outdoor hard) 2009 – present.
3 Including appearances in Grand Slam, ATP Tour main draw matches, and Summer Olympics.
4 Including matches in Grand Slam, ATP Tour events, Summer Olympics, Davis Cup and Laver Cup.

Grand Slam tournaments

Federer has won the third most Grand Slam tournaments of any male player in tennis history (20), behind Djokovic (22) and Nadal (22). He has reached the 2nd most finals (31), record most semifinals (46), quarterfinals (58), and fourth rounds (69), and has participated at the joint-most tournaments (81, along with Feliciano López). He has won the most matches at these tournaments (369). He is the only man to win three tournaments at least five times each, and to win two of these tournaments five consecutive times. He is one of eight men to win all four Grand Slam tournaments. He, along with Ivan Lendl and Novak Djokovic, has the most runner-up (11) showing in Grand Slam finals.

Grand Slam tournament finals: 31 (20 titles, 11 runner-ups)

Other significant results

Olympic medal matches

 Singles: 2 (1 silver medal) 

Doubles: 1 (1 gold medal)

Year–end championships
Federer has won the most year-end championships along with Novak Djokovic (6). He has reached the most finals (10) and semifinals (16). He has participated at the most championships consecutively (14) and the most outright (17). He has won the most matches at the championships (59).

Year–end Championship finals: 10 (6 titles, 4 runner-ups)

ATP Masters finals

Singles: 50 (28 titles, 22 runners-up)
Federer has won the third-most Masters titles (28), reached the third-most finals (50) and the third-most semifinals (66). He is one of seven men to win at least seven different titles and is one of four to reach each final. He has won the third-most matches (381) at these tournaments.

Doubles: 3 (1 title, 2 runner-ups)

ATP Tour career finals

Singles: 157 (103 titles, 54 runners-up)

Doubles: 14 (8 titles, 6 runner-ups)

ATP Challenger Tour career finals

Singles: 1 (1 title)

Doubles: 1 (1 title)

ITF Junior Circuit

Junior Grand Slam finals

Singles: 2 (1 title, 1 runner-up)

Doubles: 1 (1 title)

Singles: 6 (5 titles, 1 runner-up)

Doubles: 4 (2 titles, 2 runner-ups)

National and international representation

Team competitions finals: 10 (8 titles, 2 runner-ups)

Laver Cup: 4 (3 titles, 1 runner-up)

(8 wins – 4 losses)

   indicates the result of the Laver Cup match followed by the score, date, place of event and the court surface.

Wins: 3

Olympic Games (1 gold, 1 silver)

(20 wins – 7 losses)

Singles (13–5)

Doubles (7–2)

Wins: 1

Davis Cup: 1 (1 title)

(52 wins – 18 losses)

   indicates the result of the Davis Cup match followed by the score, date, place of event, the zonal classification and its phase, and the court surface.

Wins: 1

Hopman Cup: 3 (3 titles)

(27 wins – 9 losses)

   indicates the result of the Hopman Cup match followed by the score, date, place of event, competition phase, and the court surface.

Wins: 3

Team Tennis Leagues

League finals: 1 (1 championship)

ATP ranking

 Note: The ATP Tour was suspended from 16 March to 21 August 2020. The ATP ranking was frozen from 23 March to 23 August 2020.

ATP world No. 1 ranking

No. 1 stats
{|
|- valign=top
|

Weeks at No. 1 by span

Time spans holding the ranking

Age at first and last dates No. 1 ranking was held

*all-time records

Weeks at No. 1 by decade

 2000s 

 2010s 

Ranking by year

During season

He also has spent the total 968 non-consecutive weeks in the ATP Tour's top-10.

He first ascended into the top-10 on May 20, 2002, when he moved up from No. 14 to No. 8. Since then, he's spent:

No. 1 – 310 weeks
No. 2 – 218 weeks
No. 3 – 222 weeks
No. 4 – 54 weeks
No. 5 – 55 weeks
No. 6 – 38 weeks
No. 7 – 17 weeks
No. 8 – 25 weeks
No. 9 – 20 weeks
No. 10 – 9 weeks

*.

Coaches

 Adolf Kacovský (1989–1991) Peter Carter (1991–1994, 1996–1999) Reto Staubli (1995–1996, 2003) Peter Lundgren (1999–2003) Pierre Paganini (Fitness Coach) (2000–2022) Tony Roche (2005–2007) Severin Lüthi (2007–2022) José Higueras (2008) Paul Annacone (2010–2013) Stefan Edberg (2013–2015) Ivan Ljubičić (2016–2022)

Head-to-head records

Record against top-10 players
Federer's ATP-only record against players who have been ranked world No. 10 or higher, with those who are active in boldface.

Record against players ranked No. 11–20
Active players are in boldface.  

 Jarkko Nieminen 15–0
 Philipp Kohlschreiber 14–0
 Andreas Seppi 14–1
 Feliciano López 13–0
 Ivo Karlović 13–1
 Xavier Malisse 10–1
 Fabrice Santoro 9–2
 Florian Mayer 8–0
 Paul-Henri Mathieu 7–0
 Benoît Paire 7–0
 Andrei Pavel 7–1
 Max Mirnyi 7–2
 Juan Ignacio Chela 6–0
 Nick Kyrgios 6–1
 José Acasuso 5–0
 Alexandr Dolgopolov 5–0
 Robby Ginepri 5–0
 Dmitry Tursunov 5–0
 Sjeng Schalken 5–1
 Igor Andreev 4–0
 Marcel Granollers 4–0
 Sam Querrey 4–0
 Bernard Tomic 4–0
 Stefan Koubek 4–1
 Borna Ćorić 4–2
 Nicolas Escudé 4–3
 Frances Tiafoe 3–0
 Younes El Aynaoui 3–1
 Jan-Michael Gambill 3–1
 Chung Hyeon 2–0
 Pablo Cuevas 2–0
 Guido Pella 2–0
 Albert Portas 2–0
 Viktor Troicki 2–0
 Martin Verkerk 2–0
 Albert Ramos Viñolas 2–1
 Vincent Spadea 2–1
 Alex de Minaur 1–0
 Kyle Edmund 1–0
 Jerzy Janowicz 1–0
 Nikoloz Basilashvili 1–1
 Dominik Hrbatý 1–2
 Francisco Clavet 0–1
 Andrea Gaudenzi 0–1
 Jan Siemerink 0–1
 Franco Squillari 0–2

*

Wins over top ranked players

Wins over top ranked opposition
Federer has a  record against players who were, at the time the match was played, top ranked player, or if he was world No. 1 himself, then the highest ranked player other than himself which is the world No. 2.  

Top-10 wins
Federer has the second-most wins over top-10 ranked players in the Open Era (behind Novak Djokovic) and is the first and only one of the two players (other being Djokovic) in the Open Era to reach 200 top-10 wins.
He has a  record against players who were, at the time the match was played, ranked in the top 10. Federer has 10 wins over No. 1-ranked players, beating Djokovic 5 times, Nadal 3 times, Hewitt and Roddick once.

ATP Tour career earnings

* Statistics correct .

Longest winning streaks
Federer holds nine winning streaks of eighteen matches or more and seven winning streaks of twenty matches or more with his two longest among the top 10 of the era.

41-match win streak 2006–2007
This is the seventh longest all-surface streak of the Open Era.

35-match win streak 2005
This is tied for eighth longest all-surface streak of the Open Era.

56-match hard court win streak 2005–2006
This is the longest hard court streak of the Open Era.

65-match grass court win streak 2003–2008
This is the longest grass streak of the Open Era.

49-match win streak in the United States 2004–2006
This is the longest streak on American soil of the Open Era.

Career Grand Slam tournament seedings
The tournaments won by Federer are in boldface. Federer has been seeded first in 24 Grand Slam tournaments, with 18 of those being consecutively. Also, he was seeded first or second in 30 consecutive Grand Slams and was among the top 4 seeds for 10 straight years after winning his first Grand Slam (the 2003 Wimbledon Championships), through the 2013 Wimbledon Championships. He has both won and been runner-up at tournaments when seeded 1st, 2nd, 3rd and 4th.

* 

Career milestone wins

Centennial match wins

Bold indicates that he went on to win the tournament.

Milestone Grand Slam match wins

Bold indicates that he went on to win the tournament.

Milestone hard court match wins

Bold indicates that he went on to win the tournament.

Milestone grass court match wins

Bold indicates that he went on to win the tournament.

Exhibitions and charity matches

Tournament finals

Singles

Third & Fifth place matches

Doubles

Matches

Singles

Doubles

Team competitions

Tours

2012 South America Tour
The South America Tour was sponsored by Gillette and called Gillette Federer Tour'''. Federer's tour was an exhibition tennis tournament that took place in December 2012 in Brazil, Argentina and Colombia. This tournament is the largest tennis event in Latin America. The exhibition tournament brought together world-class tennis players such as Guillermo Vilas, Tommy Haas, Juan Martín del Potro, Jo-Wilfried Tsonga, José Luis Clerc, Tommy Robredo, Bryan brothers, Serena Williams, Maria Sharapova, Victoria Azarenka, Caroline Wozniacki, as well as the Brazilians Thomaz Bellucci, Bruno Soares and Marcelo Melo, and of course Roger Federer himself. This was also the first time the Swiss visited Brazil.

2019 Latin America Tour

With the Latin America Tour, was the second time that Roger Federer toured in South America and first time in Latin American countries. Federer's second tour was an exhibition tennis tournament that took place in November 2019 in Chile, Argentina, Colombia, Mexico and Ecuador.

See also

List of career achievements by Roger Federer
Open Era tennis records – men's singles
All-time tennis records – men's singles
 List of flag bearers for Switzerland at the Olympics
Sport in Switzerland

References

External links
 
 
 

Statistics
Tennis career statistics
Sport in Switzerland